In signal processing, a band-stop filter or band-rejection filter is a filter that passes most frequencies unaltered, but attenuates those in a specific range to very low levels.  It is the opposite of a band-pass filter.  A notch filter is a band-stop filter with a narrow stopband (high Q factor).

Narrow notch filters (optical) are used in Raman spectroscopy, live sound reproduction (public address systems, or PA systems) and in instrument amplifiers (especially amplifiers or preamplifiers for acoustic instruments such as acoustic guitar, mandolin, bass instrument amplifier, etc.) to reduce or prevent audio feedback, while having little noticeable effect on the rest of the frequency spectrum (electronic or software filters). Other names include "band limit filter", "T-notch filter", "band-elimination filter", and "band-reject filter".

Typically, the width of the stopband is 1 to 2 decades (that is, the highest frequency attenuated is 10 to 100 times the lowest frequency attenuated).  However, in the audio band, a notch filter has high and low frequencies that may be only semitones apart.

Mathematical description 
Band-stop filter can be represented as a combination of low-pass and high-pass filters if the bandwidth is wide enough that the two filters do not interact too much.  A more general approach is to design as a low-pass prototype filter which can then be transformed into a bandstop.  The simple notch filter shown can be directly analysed.  The transfer function is,

Zero frequency is the cutoff frequency and  sets the type of the notch filter: standard notch when , low-pass notch and high-pass notch filters.  denotes the Q-factor.

For standard notch filter the formulation can be rewritten as

Examples

In the audio domain 
Anti-hum filter
For countries using 60 Hz power lines:
 low frequency: 59 Hz,
 middle frequency: 60 Hz,
 high frequency: 61 Hz.
This means that the filter passes all frequencies, except for the range of 59–61 Hz. This would be used to filter out the mains hum from the 60 Hz power line, though its higher harmonics could still be present.

For countries where power transmission is at 50 Hz, the filter would have a 49–51 Hz range.

In the radio-frequency (RF) domain 
Non-linearities of power amplifiers
When measuring the non-linearities of power amplifiers, a very narrow notch filter can be very useful to avoid the carrier frequency. Use of the filter may ensure that the maximum input power of a spectrum analyser used to detect spurious content will not be exceeded.

Wave trap 
A notch filter, usually a simple LC circuit, is used to remove a specific interfering frequency.  This is a technique used with radio receivers that are so close to a transmitter that it swamps all other signals. The wave trap is used to remove or greatly reduce the signal from the nearby transmitter.

Software-defined radio
Most affordable software-defined radios (SDR) on the market today suffer from limited dynamic and operating ranges. In other words, in real-world operating environments, a SDR can easily be saturated by a strong signal. In particular FM broadcast signals are very strong and nearly everywhere. These signals can prevent a SDR from processing other weak signals. FM notch filters are very useful for SDR applications and have increased in their popularity.

Optical filtering (wavelength selection) 

In optics, there are several methods of filtering selected wavelengths from a source or to a detector. They rely on scattering or destructive interference.

Filtering by scattering and diffraction 
A diffraction grating or a dispersive prism may be used to selectively redirect selected wavelengths of light within an optical system. 

In the case of transmission gratings and prisms, polychromatic light that passes through the object will be redirected according to wavelength. A slit may then be used to select wavelengths that are desired. A reflective grating may also be utilized for the same purpose, though in this case light is reflected rather than transmitted. Filters of this design may be high-pass, band-pass, or low-pass, depending on system configuration.

Filtering by interference 

When using optics with real materials, light will be attenuated at various wavelengths through interference with the medium through which the light traversed. In this sense, material selection may be utilized to selectively filter light according to the wavelengths that are minimally attenuated. To some extent, all real optical systems will suffer from this phenomenon.

Alternatively, it is also possible to use an oscillating reflecting surface to cause destructive interference with reflected light along a single optical path. This principle is the basis for a Michelson interferometer.

See also
Parametric equalizer

References 

Linear filters
Synthesiser modules
Filter frequency response
Optical filters